Christian observances of Yom Kippur occur when a Christian-style Day of Atonement models itself on the Jewish holiday of Yom Kippur.

Sabbatarian churches
As observed by the Living Church of God and United Church of God:
The Christian Day of Atonement is based on the English translation of the Jewish Holy day Yom Kippur. The day is commemorated with a 25-hour fast by Jews, but normally a 24-hour fast by Christians who observe it. While not observed by the mainstream of professing Christianity, the Christian groups (mostly those with origins in the old Worldwide Church of God) that do observe it usually refer to it as the Day of Atonement...

Generally, the Sacred Name Movement and groups reject Easter and Christmas as pagan in origin and observe the holy days of Leviticus 23 such as Yom Kippur, as well as Passover and the Feast of Weeks.

Messianic Jewish congregations

Messianic Jewish congregations devote serious effort at presenting a rationale for taking Yom Kippur. Such as by the Emmanuel Messianic Jewish Congregation (Clarksville, Maryland, USA):

Jews for Jesus
Jews for Jesus describes its observances of this day as follows:

Criticism

See also
 Christian observances of Jewish holidays

References

Mosaic law in Christian theology
Yom Kippur
Cultural appropriation